Ram Kumar Gyawali is a Nepalese politician, belonging to the CPN (Unified Socialist). He was elected MP in 1994, but lost his seat in 1999. He is the deputy in charge of Sudurpashchim Province of CPN(Unified Socialist).

References

Communist Party of Nepal (Unified Socialist) politicians
Living people
Year of birth missing (living people)
Nepal MPs 1994–1999